Anbay (Qatabanian: , romanized:) is a pre-Islamic deity who was originally worshipped in Qataban, in what is now Yemen. He was regarded as a deity of justice and an oracle, in attendance to the moon deity Amm. Anbay's name was invoked in a range of legal matters, from filing paperwork for the legal title of a building to the royal regulation of water supplies.
He is often mentioned together with Haukim, another god of justice.

References

Arabian gods
Justice gods
Oracular gods